Rajaei Ayed Fadel Hasan is a Jordanian professional footballer who plays for  the Jordan national football team.

International career statistics

References

External links 
 Rajaei Ayed at kooora.com
 Rajaei Ayed at soccerpunter.com
 
 Rajaei Ayed at goal.com

1993 births
Living people
Jordanian footballers
Jordan international footballers
Jordan youth international footballers
Jordanian Pro League players
Al-Wehdat SC players
Rajaei Ayed
Rajaei Ayed
Jordanian expatriate footballers
Jordanian expatriate sportspeople in Thailand
Expatriate footballers in Thailand
2015 AFC Asian Cup players
Sportspeople from Amman
Jordanian people of Palestinian descent
Association football midfielders